Rui Yang from the University of Oklahoma, Norman, Oklahoma, was named Fellow of the Institute of Electrical and Electronics Engineers (IEEE) in 2014 for contributions to the mid-infrared interband cascade laser and related optoelectronic devices.

References

External links
OU Bio

Fellow Members of the IEEE
Living people
Year of birth missing (living people)
Place of birth missing (living people)
University of Oklahoma faculty